Rose Alba (born Felicity Mary Devereux; 5 February 19182 December 2005) was an Egyptian-born British film actress.

She also acted in TV series, such as The Persuaders!, in the episode Angie, Angie (1971), as Madame La Gata.

She died in December 2005 in London, England at the age of 87.

Filmography

References

External links
 

1918 births
2005 deaths
British film actresses
Actresses from Cairo
Egyptian emigrants to the United Kingdom